The Living Things World Tour was the eighth concert tour by American alternative metal band Linkin Park. It was launched in support of Linkin Park's fifth studio album Living Things (2012). The tour was officially announced in April 2012 through a teaser released after the release of trailer of the 11th Annual Honda Civic Tour by  Linkin Park and Incubus. Later tour was officially announced during the Honda Civic Tour. Its first official leg under the name Living Things South American Tour began on September 14, 2012, in Mexico City and ended on October 12, 2012, in Porto Alegre. Two shows during the whole tour were cancelled. Both the shows were in Brazil. The following statement was issued on the official site: "Due to logistical issues, some changes have been made to Linkin Park's upcoming Brazilian tour.

Background
The tour's first leg was in Latin America where the band played 6 shows. The tour began on September 14, 2012 in Mexico City and ended on October 12, 2012 in Porto Alegre. The second leg of the tour started after a month, and was titled as "Living Things South African Tour". The duration of the second leg was 4 days which included only 2 shows. Kongos were included as Special guest during this leg. It started on November 7, at Cape Town. This show marked the band's first show in Africa. A number of fans were injured before the show when scaffolding outside the venue fell on them due to the high winds. One fan died as a result and a number of others were hospitalized. Mike Shinoda addressed the accident at the following show on November 10, 2012, Johannesburg. The show in Johannesburg included 65,300 people in attendance.

The third leg of the tour started on February 21, 2013, with a LPU summit. Parts of the event were live streamed via the "LPU livestream.com" account. There was no DSP (Digital Souvenir Package) for the entire leg which was confirmed on February 25, 2013, as Las Vegas and the entire New Zealand/Australia Tour (8 shows) in February and March would not be getting DSPs.
The fourth and the final leg was announced May 15, 2013. The tickets were made available on the same date by "SMTickets". The final leg was presented by "Scala events". The first show was played on August 10, 2013, at Chiba for the "Summer Sonic", where the band played with various bands like Metallica, Fall Out Boy, Bullet For My Valentine, Maximum The Hormone, One Ok Rock and Volbeat. After the show Mike and Chester joined "Steve Aoki" and played their single "A Light That Never Comes" for the first time. The last 2 show of the tour was on August 19, at "Kuala Lumpur".

Development
Sales for general tickets began on October 2, 2012. "SMTickets" made tickets as pre-sale for the fourth leg. The set list mixed Living Things with the rest of the band's catalog.
A half-minute-long trailer for the tour premiered in May 2013, featuring a Japanese narrator and assorted live scenes, paired with some of the bands' songs, including "Burn It Down", "What I've Done", "In The End" and "Castle of Glass" by Linkin Park. The promotional poster for the tour featured the Vinyl cover of the album. The volunteering during the tour was done by "Machine Shop"

Support Acts

Vetamadre (Buenos Aires)
Charlie Brown Jr. (São Paulo)
Reação em Cadeia (Porto Alegre)
Kongos (South Africa)
Stone Sour (Australia & New Zealand)

Set list
This set list is representative of the show in Buenos Aires at Estadio G.E.B.A.. It does not represent all dates throughout the tour.

"Tinfoil"
"Faint"
"Papercut"
"Given Up"
"With You"
"Somewhere I Belong"
"In My Remains"
"New Divide"
"Victimized" / "QWERTY"
"Points of Authority"
"Lies Greed Misery"
"Waiting for the End" (contains excerpts of "Until It Breaks")
"Breaking the Habit"
Medley: "Leave Out All the Rest" / "Shadow of the Day" / "Iridescent"
"The Catalyst"
"Lost in the Echo"
"Numb/Encore"
"What I've Done"
"One Step Closer"

Encore
"Burn It Down"
"In the End"
"Bleed It Out" (contains excerpts of "Sabotage up until December 2012" by Beastie Boys)

Tour dates

References

External links

Linkin Park concert tours
2012 concert tours
2013 concert tours

Megaland